Tussenobba Peak is a peak, 2,665 m, rising 6 nautical miles (11 km) northeast of Halsknappane Hills in the east part of the Muhlig-Hofmann Mountains in Queen Maud Land. Mapped by Norwegian cartographers from surveys and air photos by the Norwegian Antarctic Expedition (1956–60) and named Tussenobba.

References

Mountains of Queen Maud Land
Princess Astrid Coast